The Canon EOS RP is a 26.2-megapixel full-frame mirrorless interchangeable-lens camera launched by Canon in March 2019. The camera is reported to be the least expensive full frame camera to be produced. In addition to the standard black model, 5000 units of a limited edition gold model were sold in Japan to commemorate the Tokyo 2020 Olympic Games.

Features

The "R" in EOS RP comes from the first letter of "Reimagine optical excellence", Canon's development concept for the EOS R system as a whole. The "P" stands for ‘Popular’, in the Japanese sense of meaning ‘for everybody’.

Image features
The Canon EOS RP features a 35 mm (36 mm × 24 mm) (full frame) CMOS sensor capable of capturing approximately 26.2 effective megapixels. The camera features the DIGIC 8 image processor, first introduced in February 2018. The EOS RP does not have in-body image stabilization, however, image stabilization can be achieved using a lens with optical lens-based stabilization, either native EOS RF lenses with IS, or Canon EOS EF lenses (through the official Canon RF-EF Adapter) with IS.

Autofocus and metering
The camera's 143-point autofocus sensors uses Canon's Dual Pixel AF system to capture and record and offers 88% horizontal and 100% vertical frame coverage. The EOS RP has 4,779 manually selectable focusing points.

When recording in 4K Ultra HD resolution, focusing is restricted to contrast-detection autofocus instead of using the preferable Dual Pixel AF system, the former exhibiting undesirable focus hunting and is not as smooth as the Dual Pixel AF system that's available in HD modes.

ISO
The EOS RP's ISO is 100–40000 with expansion down to ISO 50 and up to ISO 51200 equivalent (H1) and ISO 102,400 equivalent (H2).

Shutter
The EOS RP's shutter speed range is 30 s to 1/4,000 s (bulb). The camera has an approximate maximum continuous shooting speed of 5.0 frames per second in High-Speed Continuous Shooting drive mode and a shooting speed of 4 frames per second in Shooting Speed Priority mode.

Ergonomics and functions
The EOS RP has a flip-around 7.5 cm (3 inch) TFT LCD screen with a resolution of 1,040,000 dots with touchscreen capabilities. The .99 cm (.39 inch) OLED electronic viewfinder has a resolution of 2,360,000 dots and a .70x magnification, a downgrade from the Canon EOS R which had a larger screen size by 1.25 cm (.50 inch) and resolution of 3,360,000 dots.

While the EOS RP body is similar to that of its predecessor, the Canon EOS R, it does not have the Touch Bar control or a secondary status LCD display screen. The EOS RP body weighs  while the camera body with battery and memory card weighs . It is Canon's lightest and most compact full frame camera.

Video
The camera can record 4K  (cropped) Ultra HD (3840 × 2160) at 23.98 frames per second with a noticeable APS-C sensor crop of about 1.7x. The camera additionally records Full HD (1920 × 1080) and Standard HD (1280 × 720) at 59.94, 29.97, and as of firmware update version 1.4, 1080p at 23.98 frames per second. Similar to many other DSLR cameras, the continuous recording time for the EOS RP is limited to 29 minutes and 59 seconds for all video resolutions.

Lenses
The EOS RP is the second camera to use Canon's RF lens mount. It is possible to use older EF and EF-S lenses with one of the three available Canon EOS R mount adapters. With EF-S lenses the camera only functions as an APS-C camera and can only shoot 720p or 4K video without Dual Pixel AF. At launch of the RP, only four RF lenses were available, however  over 24 RF lenses are available.

Reception
On launch, the EOS RP received mixed reviews from technology blogs due to the cropped video resolution and the limited number of RF lenses available at launch. Comparatively, photographers welcomed the camera's low price and its low weight for a full-frame mirrorless camera.

Technology blog Engadget summarized the EOS RP as a disappointment citing concerns with the camera's 4K resolution video being noticeably cropped and limited autofocus detection while recording. It also noted that two of the four RF lenses available at launch were "nearly twice as expensive as the camera itself". Digital Trends provided a mixed review by identifying "some purposefully truncated features" and corroborated on the EOS RP's video abilities by stating that "video feels like an afterthought". T3 Magazine concurred with the limited video functionality and like the EOS R, its insufficient FPS for fast sports shooting. However it claimed there was 'plenty to like about it' but 'a bit of a mixed bag' similar to the R model, also awarding it 4 stars. TechRadar awarded it 4 stars, concluding the RP has a 'capable feature set, a generally sound performance and a very reasonable asking price' mainly criticizing the lack of affordable lenses available. 

Retrospective reviews have been more positive, noting the increasing number of RF lenses available and the low price of the camera. In October 2021, Digital Camera World awarded the camera 4 stars, concluding that the camera was "far from an entry level camera, but .. ideal an entry level full-frame camera." In a comparison of Canon's all then-available RF mount camera, Ken Rockwell expressed a particular affection for the RP despite its technical downsides, praising it for the "smallest size, lowest weight, direct controls and by far lowest price" of the camera line-up and concluding that the RP is "everything mirrorless was always supposed to be". In his standalone review of the camera, Ken Rockwell named it "[the] World's Best Practical Mirrorless Camera".

See also
 Canon EOS

References

External links

Canon RF-mount cameras
Cameras introduced in 2019
Full-frame mirrorless interchangeable lens cameras